US Koroki is a Togolese football club based in Tchamba. They play in the top division in Togolese football. Their home stadium is Stade Maman N'Danida.

Achievements
Togolese Championnat National: 1
2018

References

Football clubs in Togo